Elizabeth Monck, Duchess of Albemarle (22 February 1654 – 11 September 1734), later Elizabeth Montagu, Duchess of Montagu, was the eldest daughter of Henry Cavendish, 2nd Duke of Newcastle, and his wife, Frances Pierrepont (1630–1695; daughter of the Hon. William Pierrepont). 

Lady Elizabeth Cavendish married Christopher Monck (later Duke of Albemarle) on 30 December 1669 at Whitehall, London. She went with her husband to Jamaica when he was appointed Lieutenant Governor in 1687; there Monck amassed a small fortune, which Elizabeth acquired and brought with her back to England upon his death in the following year (1688).

Elizabeth was given the epithet of "the Mad Duchess of Albemarle" -- viz. she declared that she would only marry into royalty and was convinced that the Kangxi Emperor of Qing Dynasty China wished to marry her.  Her sister-in-law Elizabeth's stepfather, the Duke of Montagu -- suitably dressed as the Emperor of China -- asked for her hand in marriage and they were wed on 8 September 1692 in Newcastle House, London.

The comedic play The Double Gallant; or, Sick Lady's Cure (1707) was in part based on the story Duchess of Albemarle's marriage to the Duke of Montagu. "Richard, Lord Ross" -- one of her rejected suitors -- wrote the following lines of poem regarding the marriage:

However, the holder of the title "Lord Ross" at that time was William Ross, 12th Lord Ross.

Elizabeth died in 1734 and was buried in Westminster Abbey.

References

Sources
Beaulieu Palace 

1654 births
1734 deaths
Burials at Westminster Abbey
Elizabeth
English duchesses by marriage
Daughters of English dukes
Elizabeth
Wives of knights